A snarl is a type of facial expression.

Snarl may also refer to:
Snarl (Transformers), several fictional robot superhero characters from the Transformers robot superhero franchise.
Snarl (software), a notification system for the Windows operating system